Sweet Country  is a 1987 American drama film directed by Michael Cacoyannis and starring Jane Alexander.

It is based on the 1979 novel with the same name by Caroline Richards and it is set in Chile during the military takeover of 1973.

Plot

Cast 
 Jane Alexander	as 	Anna
 John Cullum		as 		Ben
 Franco Nero		as 		Paul
 Carole Laure		as 		Eva
 Joanna Pettet		as 		Monica
 Randy Quaid		as 		Juan
 Irene Papas		as 		Mrs. Araya
 Jean-Pierre Aumont		as 		Mr. Araya
 Pierre Vaneck		as 		Father Venegas

References

External links

1987 films
1987 drama films
Films about the Chilean military dictatorship
Films set in Chile
Films shot in Greece
Films directed by Michael Cacoyannis
Films about coups d'état
1980s English-language films